6K, VI-K or 6k may refer to:
 6K resolution, an image or display resolution
 China Railways Class 6K, a Japanese-built electric locomotive used in China
 Form 6K, a U.S. Securities and Exchange Commission filling
 Stalag VI-K, a former German prisoner of war camp at Stuckenbrock, Germany
and also :
 6000 (number)
 Inter Airlines IATA airline code
 Asian Spirit IATA airline code
6K, the production code for the 1983 Doctor Who serial The Five Doctors

See also
K6 (disambiguation)